Crambus sudanicola is a moth in the family Crambidae. It was described by Strand in 1915. It is found in Sudan.

References

Endemic fauna of Sudan
Crambini
Moths described in 1915
Moths of Africa